The Department of Health, previously combined as the Department of Health and Human Services, is the Tasmanian Government department with responsibilities regarding hospitals, ambulances, public housing, community health, and related areas including limited involvement in primary healthcare. The department is the largest of all the Tasmanian Government agencies.

The department is led by its Secretary, Kathryn Morgan-Wicks. The Secretary is responsible to the Minister for Health, presently the Honourable Sarah Courtney MP, and the Minister for Mental Health and Wellbeing, presently the Honourable Jeremy Rockliff MP.

Through the Tasmanian Health Service, the department has responsibility for the public hospital system, community health care services and some primary.  This includes delivery of health care at the Launceston General Hospital, the Royal Hobart Hospital, Mersey Community Hospital, and the North West Regional Hospital.

Through a range of other government agencies, the department has responsibility for other government functions delivered by Aboriginal Housing Services Tasmania, Adoptions and Permanency Service, Alcohol and Drug Service, Ambulance Tasmania, Correctional Primary Health Service, Disability and Community Services, Family Violence Counselling and Support Service, Housing Tasmania, Mental Health Services, Oral Health Services Tasmania, Orthotic and Prosthetic Service, Palliative Care Service, Pharmaceutical Services, Public and Environmental Health, Sexual Health Service Tasmania, Tasmanian Clinical Genetics Service, Tasmanian Infection Prevention and Control Unit, WP Holman Clinic, and the Youth Justice Services.

See also

 List of hospitals in Tasmania
 List of Tasmanian government agencies

References

External links
 

Health and Human Services
Tasmania Health and Human Services
Health in Tasmania
Health policy in Australia